Osage Township is a township in Mitchell County, Iowa, USA.

History
Osage Township was established about 1855. It was named for Orrin Sage.

References

Townships in Mitchell County, Iowa
Townships in Iowa